Malibu Beach Party is a 1940 Warner Bros. Merrie Melodies cartoon directed by Friz Freleng. The short was released on September 14, 1940.

The short is a parody of the popular radio comedy series, The Jack Benny Show.

Synopsis

An invitation goes out to Hollywood stars to a beach party at the Malibu beach home of "Jack Bunny," a parody of Jack Benny. Caricatured figures of Benny and Mary Livingstone welcome guests, many attired as characters from their recent film appearances. These include Bob Hope, Bette Davis (dressed as the Virgin Queen from The Private Lives of Elizabeth and Essex), Andy Devine, Benny's co-star in Buck Benny Rides Again, Spencer Tracy (as Henry Morton Stanley in Stanley and Livingstone), Robert Donat as the title character of Goodbye, Mr. Chips. Kay Kyser, in his professorial regalia from radio's Kay Kyser's Kollege of Musical Knowledge, makes a brief appearance.

On Jack's patio, a caricatured version of George Raft flips a coin as became his trademark in 1932's Scarface, while Clark Gable floats on his back in the ocean, using his oversize ears to paddle backwards. Greta Garbo is also on the surface of the ocean — riding the waves, with her large shoes serving as combination water skis and double surfboards. As Cesar Romero sunbathes on the beach, John Barrymore, quoting Shakespeare's Julius Caesar, "I come to bury Caesar, not to praise him," and then does so with a child's bucket and shovel. A caricature of dour Ned Sparks is berated by a fellow crab, before Fanny Brice's Baby Snooks asks for permission to cover him in sand. When he agrees (relenting only when she cries), she uses a dump truck to unload sand on Sparks.

As caricatures of Adolphe Menjou, Wallace Beery, Mary, James Cagney, and Ann Sheridan recline on the patio, Jack announces that he spared no expense in providing entertainment for the party. Gags include Winchester (a caricature of Eddie "Rochester" Anderson) and bandleader "Pill" Harris (Benny's bandleader Phil Harris), and parodies of Fred Astaire and Ginger Rogers, Deanna Durbin, Mickey Rooney (as Andy Hardy), and Cary Grant.

Jack announces that "I have a real treat in store for you, the feature attraction of this afternoon, an artist with rare ability and fine technique, a person you all know and love: Mr. Jack Bunny." A parody of Benny's notoriously bad violin-playing follows, as the guests attempt to sneak out during his performance of Träumerei.

Voice cast
 Jack Lescoulie as Jack Bunny, Phil Harris
 Sara Berner as Mary Livingstone, Actresses
 Mel Blanc as Rochester, Crab
 Danny Webb as Ned Sparks, most male actors
 Marie Greene as Durbin singing

Sources

References

External links

Malibu Beach Party at British Film Institute

1940 films
1940 animated films
1940 comedy films
Short films directed by Friz Freleng
Merrie Melodies short films
Animation based on real people
Cultural depictions of Fred Astaire
Cultural depictions of James Cagney
Cultural depictions of Greta Garbo
Cultural depictions of Clark Gable
Cultural depictions of actors
1940s Warner Bros. animated short films
1940s animated short films
Films about Hollywood, Los Angeles